Manuel "Manu" Miquel Serrano (born 23 August 1994) is a Spanish footballer who plays for UD San Sebastián de los Reyes as a midfielder.

Club career
Born in Palma del Río, Province of Córdoba, Andalusia, Miquel finished his formation with local Córdoba CF, making his senior debuts with the reserves in the lower leagues. On 2 June 2013 he played his first official game with the first team, starting in a 1–2 home loss against CD Mirandés in the Segunda División.

On 19 August 2013, Miquel joined Albacete Balompié of the Segunda División B. He would spend the most of his spell registered with the B-team in the Tercera División, however.

On 27 January 2016 Miquel moved to another reserve team, Atlético Levante UD also in the third tier.

References

External links

1994 births
Living people
Spanish footballers
Footballers from Andalusia
Association football midfielders
Segunda División players
Segunda División B players
Tercera División players
Córdoba CF B players
Córdoba CF players
Atlético Albacete players
Albacete Balompié players
Atlético Levante UD players
FC Jumilla players
CD Don Benito players
UD San Sebastián de los Reyes players